Jake Squared is a 2013 comedy drama film directed by Howard Goldberg, and starring Elias Koteas, Virginia Madsen, Mike Vogel, Jane Seymour, Jennifer Jason Leigh and Gia Mantegna. It was filmed in Hollywood.

Plot
A filmmaker sets out to make a new project in order to figure out how he's screwed up every relationship he's ever had. But, the filming spirals out of his control and he winds up having what's either a mystical experience, a nervous breakdown, or both, as his past selves and loves literally and hysterically catch up with him.

Reception
The review aggregator Rotten Tomatoes reports a 22% approval rating, based on nine reviews with an average score of 4.75/10.

References

External links
 

2013 films
American comedy-drama films
2013 comedy-drama films
2013 comedy films
2010s English-language films
2010s American films